K. Balabharathi is an Indian politician and was a member of the Fourteenth Assembly of Tamil Nadu from the Dindigul constituency. She represented the Communist Party of India (Marxist) party, for whom she had also been elected to the previous Assembly from the same constituency in the 2006 elections.

After she announced retirement from elections, the elections of 2016 resulted in her constituency being won by ADMK candidate Dindigul C.Sreenivasan against 
DMK candidate Basheer Ahmed.

Controversies 
She had refused to pay toll charges of Rs.45 in toll gate near Erode. Traffic piled up because of her argument with toll officials and withheld traffic for almost 1 hour. She later accused the toll officials of threatening her with gun, which was later found that toll officials passed by her carrying collection money with armed personals to nearby bank.

References 

Communist Party of India (Marxist) politicians from Tamil Nadu
Tamil Nadu MLAs 2011–2016
Living people
21st-century Indian women politicians
21st-century Indian politicians
People from Dindigul district
Tamil Nadu MLAs 2006–2011
Year of birth missing (living people)
Women members of the Tamil Nadu Legislative Assembly